Parsley or garden parsley most often refers to the widely cultivated culinary herb Petroselinum crispum

Parsley or wild parsley may also refer to:

Plants
 Apiaceae, the parsley family:
 under Anthriscus, the chervil genus:
 Anthriscus cerefolium (chervil), an herb also known as "French parsley" or "beaked parsley"
 Anthriscus sylvestris, sometimes known as "cow parsley" or "wild beaked parsley"
 under Petroselinum, the parsley genus:
 Petroselinum segetum, also known as "corn parsley", the closest relative of garden parsley
 Musineon, the wild parsley genus
 in other genera:
 Aethusa cynapium, "fool's parsley", also known as "poison parsley"
 Heracleum mantegazzianum, sometimes known as "giant cow parsley"
 Orlaya grandiflora, sometimes known as "French cow parsley"
 Peucedanum palustre, sometimes known as "milk parsley"

In other botanical families:
 Anogramma ascensionis (family Pteridaceae), also known as "Ascension Island parsley fern"
 Aphanes (family Rosaceae), the parsley-piert genus
 Crataegus marshallii (family Rosaceae), also called "parsley haw" or "parsley-leaved hawthorn"
 Cryptogramma crispa (family Pteridaceae), also known as "parsley fern"
 Wild parsley, a generic term used for many plants with leaves resembling parsley

Other uses
Parsley, West Virginia, a community in the United States
Parsley the Lion, a British children's television character
Parsley (name)